Champions Bowl I was the inaugural title game of Champions Indoor Football. It was played on June 20, 2015, at the Tyson Events Center in Sioux City, Iowa. The one-seed Sioux City Bandits defeated the two-seed Texas Revolution by a score of 76–61 to earn the Champions Cup.

Road to the Champions Bowl
The four teams (ordered by seeding) that made the postseason were the Sioux City Bandits, Texas Revolution, Wichita Force, and Amarillo Venom. On Thursday, June 11, Texas defeated Wichita 39–27. Two days later, Sioux City beat Amarillo 83–52. This pitted Texas against Sioux City in Champions Bowl I on June 20 in Iowa.

Game summary
The Champions Bowl was a highly anticipated event in both Siouxland and the Dallas-Fort Worth area, as the number one offense (Sioux City) faced the top defense (Texas). It was a well-fought game, especially at halftime, as the score was tied 35–35. But a rushing touchdown for eventual Champions Bowl MVP Drew Prohaska and a Rahn Franklin interception sealed the deal for the Bandits as they defeated the "Revs", 76–61 in front of a raucous crowd.

References

2015 Champions Indoor Football season
Champions Bowl
Sioux City Bandits
Texas Revolution (indoor football)
2015 in sports in Iowa
Sports competitions in Iowa
June 2015 sports events in the United States